The 2004 Travis Perkins UK Championship was a professional ranking snooker tournament that took place between 15 and 28 November 2004 at the Barbican Centre in York, England.

During the qualification Jamie Burnett compiled a 148 break, the only break exceeding 147 in professional competition.

Matthew Stevens was the defending champion, but lost his first round match to Barry Pinches.

Stephen Maguire won his first UK Championship, beating David Gray 10–1 in the final. During the tournament Gray compiled his first maximum break, the 50th ever made in professional play.

Tournament summary

Defending champion Matthew Stevens was the number 1 seed with World Champion Ronnie O'Sullivan seeded 2. The remaining places were allocated to players based on the world rankings.

Prize fund
The breakdown of prize money for this year is shown below:

Winner: £70,000
Runner-up: £35,000
Semi-final: £17,500
Quarter-final: £14,000
Last 16: £10,500
Last 32: £7,200
Last 48: £4,125
Last 64: £2,000

Stage two highest break: £6,000
Stage two maximum break: £25,000

Main draw

Final

Qualifying
Qualifying for the tournament took place between 14 and 19 October 2004 at Pontin's in Prestatyn, Wales.

Century breaks

Televised stage centuries

 147, 139, 118, 105  David Gray
 141, 131, 122, 118, 110, 106, 104, 102, 100  Stephen Maguire
 141  Stephen Hendry
 140, 116  Ricky Walden
 136, 136, 111  Peter Ebdon
 130, 128  Mark King
 130, 107  Ryan Day
 128  Chris Small
 120  Robert Milkins
 118, 113, 102  Ronnie O'Sullivan

 117  Alan McManus
 114, 102  Joe Perry
 114  John Higgins
 113, 104  Stephen Lee
 112, 100  Barry Hawkins
 107  Ali Carter
 105  Jimmy Michie
 101  John Parrott
 101  Graeme Dott

Qualifying stage centuries

 148, 115, 113, 104, 103  Jamie Burnett
 143, 133  Shaun Murphy
 134, 132, 106  Robin Hull
 133, 101  Andy Hicks
 132, 130, 101  David McDonnell
 132, 108  Rory McLeod
 131, 118  James Wattana
 131  Gary Wilson
 130, 121, 101  Stuart Bingham
 129, 124, 14, 102  Ding Junhui
 129  Nigel Bond
 128, 125, 112  Ricky Walden
 126  Bjorn Haneveer
 126  Ryan Day
 124, 113  John Parrott
 121, 116, 111, 109   Neil Robertson

 120  Simon Bedford
 120  Gerard Greene
 120  Joe Jogia
 119  Steve James
 117  Alfie Burden
 115, 100  Paul Davies
 113  Shokat Ali
 111  Leo Fernandez
 109, 104  Michael Judge
 108  Anthony Davies
 106  Stephen Maguire
 102  Fergal O'Brien
 101  Dominic Dale
 101  Adam Davies
 101  Barry Pinches
 100  Nick Dyson

Notes

References 

2004
UK Championship
UK Championship
UK Championship